The Kutumb Foundation is a New Delhibased NGO. It was founded in 2002. The NGO works in Khan Market, Ali Vihar, Nizamuddin Sunder Nursery Slum and Savda-Ghevra Jhuggi Jhopri Resettlement Colony.  Kutumb works in the field of education through its Indradhanush programme, an initiative to use peer teachers and in-house curriculum to teach English, Hindi and Maths.  They also have two Qissagadh Active Libraries and run a Library Outreach programme.  Another initiative of the organisation is their Dhamaa Chaukdi workshop series; these workshops use drama in education strategies to share Kutumb's best practices with teachers from government schools and other non-profits.  The organisation also runs a football and life skills programme called Goal of Life.  Overall Kutumb works with over 350 disadvantaged youth per year.  Since 2006, Kutumb has also held an annual theatre event, Hilley-ley.

References

 "Goal of life". The Hindu.  22 November 2003.
 "It's their kutumb, after all!". The Hindu Business Line. 1 December 2003.
 Gulf News
 The Hindu
 The Hindu
 The Hindu

External links

Educational charities
Healthcare in Delhi
Charities based in India
Non-profit organisations based in India
Organisations based in Delhi